Fabyan (previously known as New Boston) is a village in the town of Thompson, Connecticut.  The former Indian village of Maanexit was located near what is now Fabyan and Maanexit was a praying town which was home to a population of Praying Indians. Fabyan started as a mill village, named New Boston, which contained a clothier and a potash manufacturer as well as the New Boston Textile Company, which was purchased  in 1908 by the Fabyan Brothers, who changed the name of the mill and village to Fabyan.

References

Villages in Connecticut